The cross moline (also cross anchory, French croix ancrée "anchor cross") is a Christian cross, constituting a kind of heraldic cross.

History
The name derives from its shape, which resembles a millrind, the iron clamp of the upper millstone, moline being the Old French for a mill. It is very similar to one of the varieties of the "fer de moline" heraldic charge (literal French: "iron of a mill"), the forked tips of which, however, circle out slightly more, akin to the "cross recercelee". It is borne both inverted and rebated, and sometimes "saltirewise" (i.e. in the form of a saltire).

The cross moline is associated with St. Benedict of Nursia. As a result, it is widely used as an emblem by the monks and nuns of the Order of St. Benedict, which he founded.

Examples

Crosses moline appear most notably in the arms of the following: 
Families:
Molyneux, a mediaeval Anglo-French family, Earl of Sefton, Viscount Molyneux, Molyneux baronets, etc. A famous example of canting arms: Azure, a cross moline or (Burke's Armorials, 1884)
the House of Broglie
Institutions:
The University of Nottingham
Modern examples:
Knowsley Metropolitan Borough Council
Selby District Council
Huyton-with-Roby Urban District Council
North Warwickshire Borough Council
My Chemical Romance used a cross moline for MCRX.

Cercelée

A cross cercelée (or sarcelly or recercelée) is an exaggerated cross moline, and to a lesser extent similar to the anchored cross, with its forked tips curving around both ways, like a ram's horns. The form is also known as recercelée, for example by Boutell.

See also
 Cleché

References

Sources
Pimbley's Dictionary of Heraldry
Burke's Armorials, 1884
 Boutell, Charles (1890). Heraldry, Ancient and Modern: Including Boutell's Heraldry. London: Frederick Warne.

Further reading

Brooke-Little, J P, Norroy and Ulster King of Arms, An heraldic alphabet (new and revised edition), Robson Books, London, 1985 (first edition 1975);  very few illustrations
 Civic Heraldry of England and Wales, fully searchable with illustrations,  http://www.civicheraldry.co.uk
 Clark, Hugh (1892). An Introduction to Heraldry, 18th ed. (Revised by J. R. Planché). London: George Bell & Sons. First published 1775. . 
 Canadian Heraldic Authority, Public Register, with many useful official versions of modern coats of arms, searchable online http://archive.gg.ca/heraldry/pub-reg/main.asp?lang=e
 Cussans, John E. (2003). Handbook of Heraldry. Kessinger Publishing. . 
 Fox-Davies, Arthur Charles (1909). A Complete Guide to Heraldry. New York: Dodge Pub. Co. . 
Friar, Stephen (ed) A New Dictionary of Heraldry  Alphabooks, Sherborne, 1987;  with very few illustration of attitudes* Greaves, Kevin, A Canadian Heraldic Primer, Heraldry Society of Canada, Ottawa, 2000, lots but not enough illustrations
 Heraldry Society (England), members' arms, with illustrations of bearings, only accessible by armiger's name (though a Google site search would provide full searchability), https://web.archive.org/web/20091116220334/http://www.theheraldrysociety.com/resources/members.htm
 Heraldry Society of Scotland, members' arms, fully searchable with illustrations of bearings, https://web.archive.org/web/20130507090132/http://heraldry-scotland.com/copgal/thumbnails.php?album=7
 Innes of Learney, Sir Thomas, Lord Lyon King of Arms Scots Heraldry (second edition)Oliver and Boyd, Edinburgh, 1956
 Moncreiffe of Easter Moncreiffe, Iain, Kintyre Pursuivant of Arms, and Pottinger, Don, Herald Painter Extraordinary to the Court of the Lord Lyon King of Arms Simple Heraldry, Thomas Nelson and Sons, London andf Edinburgh, 1953; splendidly illustrated
 Neubecker, Ottfried (1976). Heraldry: Sources, Symbols and Meaning. Maidenhead, England: McGraw-Hill. .
 Royal Heraldry Society of Canada, Members' Roll of Arms, with illustrations of bearings, only accessible by armiger's name (though a Google site search would provide full searchability), http://www.heraldry.ca/main.php?pg=l1
 South African Bureau of Heraldry,  data on registered heraldic representations (part of  National Archives of South Africa); searchable online (but  no illustration), http://www.national.archsrch.gov.za/sm300cv/smws/sm300dl
 Volborth, Carl-Alexander von (1981). Heraldry: Customs, Rules and Styles. Poole, England: Blandford Press. . 
 Woodcock, Thomas and John Martin Robinson (1988). The Oxford Guide to Heraldry. Oxford: University Press. . 
 Woodward, John and George Burnett (1969). Woodward's a treatise on heraldry, British and foreign. Originally published 1892, Edinburgh: W. & A. B. Johnson. . 

MCR - The Black Parade

Moline
Christian crosses
Christian symbols
Cross symbols